Old All Saints Church, or Harcourt Chapel, is a redundant Church of England church near the village of Nuneham Courtenay, Oxfordshire, England. It is recorded in the National Heritage List for England as a designated Grade II* listed building, and is under the care of the Churches Conservation Trust.

History
This church is the second of three parish churches serving Nuneham Courtenay, each of which was dedicated to All Saints. The original church dated from the medieval period but was in a "ruinous state" by 1762. The medieval church was demolished by Simon Harcourt, 1st Earl Harcourt. The churchyard was destroyed and turned into a "pleasure ground" for the earl. This church was built in 1764. It was designed by the earl himself, with alterations to the design made by the architect James Stuart. Its estimated cost was over £800.

The church was sited conveniently for the earl and his family, but not for the parishioners living in the relocated village. In 1880 the third parish church was built, this one next to the new village, and the original church (the subject of this article) was converted for use as a private chapel for the family and refurnished. It was declared redundant on 8 May 1980, and was vested in the Churches Conservation Trust on 28 October 1981. For visitor access, a key can be obtained from the Global Retreat Centre nearby.

Architecture

Exterior
The church is built of limestone ashlar and has a copper-covered dome. Its design is said to be based on one of the temples of Palmyra.  The plan of the church is rectangular, with projections on each side. The principal front is the north, said to resemble the entrance front of Chiswick House. This has a projecting portico with six Ionic columns and a semicircular Diocletian window on each side of the portico. The portico is surmounted with an entablature consisting of a dentil cornice and a triangular pediment. The wall at the back of the portico contains a blind doorway and blind arches.  The south front also has a pediment but this is enclosed. It has a central doorway with wrought iron gates. The east and west fronts are semicircular and are surmounted with half domes. The west front contains an entrance porch with Ionic columns. The main central dome contains four Diocletian windows. On the exterior of the east wall is a large memorial that was moved from the earlier church.

Interior
The interior has a central rotunda and two rectangular spaces. Around the rotunda are niches, and there is a small baptistry to its south. On the walls are plaster panels containing texts. Along the walls are elaborately carved stalls that were introduced in 1880. These are in 16th-century Italian style; their backs are decorated with panels divided by Corinthian columns. The wooden lectern dates from the 17th or 18th century. The font is gadrooned and dates from 1843; it has an Italian cover in Baroque style.  Also in the church are two chests, four hatchments from the 19th century, three tapestries, relics from the funeral of Edward VII, and monuments to the Harcourt family.

See also
List of churches preserved by the Churches Conservation Trust in South East England

References

External links
Google 360° panorama of the interior of the church, seen from the chancel

Church of England church buildings in Oxfordshire
Churches preserved by the Churches Conservation Trust
Grade II* listed churches in Oxfordshire
Churches completed in 1764
1764 establishments in England
Greek Revival church buildings in the United Kingdom
Neoclassical church buildings in England